Sparreneset  is a headland in Gustav V Land at Nordaustlandet, Svalbard. It is located south of the mouth of Murchisonfjorden, about five nautical miles north of Dolomittøyane and extends about one nautical mile into Hinlopen Strait. The headland is named after Swedish politician Gustaf Adolf Vive Sparre.

References

Headlands of Nordaustlandet